Garcinia cadelliana is a critically endangered species of small tree in the family Clusiaceae found only on the South Andaman Island of India.

References

Flora of the Andaman Islands
cadelliana
Taxonomy articles created by Polbot